"She's My Baby" is a song by the British–American supergroup the Traveling Wilburys and the opening track of their 1990 album Traveling Wilburys Vol. 3. The song was written by all four members of the band – George Harrison, Jeff Lynne, Bob Dylan and Tom Petty – and each of them sing a portion of the track. The song was released as the first single from the album, although it was only issued as a promotional single in the United States. The lead guitar part is played by Gary Moore.

The band filmed a music video for the single, which was directed by David Leland and produced by Limelight Films. The clip shows the four Wilburys and drummer Jim Keltner performing the track and a snippet of Dylan riding a bike on the set. The single peaked at number 2 on the Billboard Album Rock Tracks chart peaking there for 3 weeks behind "Concrete and Steel" by ZZ Top for a week, followed by "Hard to Handle" by The Black Crowes for two additional weeks.

Track listings
 7" W9523 / 054391952370, Cassette W9523C / 054391944344

 "She's My Baby"
 "New Blue Moon" (instrumental)
 CD W9523CD / 075992179928, 12" W9523T / 075992179904
 "She's My Baby"
 "New Blue Moon" (instrumental)
 "Runaway"

Personnel
Spike Wilbury (George Harrison) – joint lead vocal, acoustic rhythm guitar]]
Clayton Wilbury (Jeff Lynne) – joint lead vocal, rhythm guitar, bass guitar
Boo Wilbury (Bob Dylan) – joint lead vocal, rhythm guitar
Muddy Wilbury (Tom Petty) – joint lead vocal, rhythm guitar

Additional musicians
Ken Wilbury (Gary Moore) – lead guitar
Jim Horn – saxophone
Ray Cooper – percussion
Buster Sidebury (Jim Keltner) – drums, percussion

Charts

References

1990 songs
1990 singles
Traveling Wilburys songs
Song recordings produced by George Harrison
Song recordings produced by Jeff Lynne
Songs written by Bob Dylan
Songs written by George Harrison
Songs written by Jeff Lynne
Songs written by Tom Petty
Warner Records singles